Qingdao University Gymnasium is an indoor sporting arena located in Qingdao, China.  The capacity of the arena is 6,000 spectators. It opened in 2005.  It hosts indoor sporting events such as basketball and volleyball.  It hosts the Qingdao DoubleStar of the Chinese Basketball Association.

See also
 Sports in China

References

Indoor arenas in China
Sports venues in Shandong
Buildings and structures in Qingdao
University sports venues in China